is a village located in Rumoi Subprefecture, Hokkaido, Japan.

As of September 2016, the village has an estimated population of 1,249 and a density of 4.5 persons per km2. The total area is 280.04 km2. Shosanbetsu observatory is a planetarium-cum-astronomical observatory which is a popular attraction in this region.

Shosanbetsu was the hometown of famed bear hunter Yamamoto Heikichi, famous for his killing of the bear Kesagake.

Climate

Mascot

Shosanbetsu's mascot is  who is an alien bear. Her ears resembled that of shooting stars. She wear a helmet that resembled a Shosanbetsu Observatory, a necklace made of blue honeysuckle and a pochette that resembled a pufferfish. She is designed by Eiichi Shiozaki of Osaka.

References

External links

Official Website 

Villages in Hokkaido